Oscar John Schmiege (March 29, 1902 – July 29, 1961) was an American politician and jurist.

Born in Appleton, Wisconsin, Schmiege graduated from Appleton High School. In 1925, Schmeige received his bachelor's degree in civil engineering from University of Wisconsin. He worked for the Wisconsin Highway Commission and a railroad. Schmiege served in the Wisconsin State Assembly from 1927 to 1933 and was a Republican. While in the Wisconsin Assembly, Schmiege received his law degree from the University of Wisconsin Law School in 1928 and was admitted to the Wisconsin bar. Schmiege was district attorney for Outagamie County, Wisconsin and then became a criminal court judge. Schmiege died in Appleton, Wisconsin of a heart attack just after he gave instructions to a jury that was hearing a murder case.

Notes

1902 births
1961 deaths
Politicians from Appleton, Wisconsin
 University of Wisconsin–Madison College of Engineering alumni
University of Wisconsin Law School alumni
American civil engineers
Wisconsin lawyers
Wisconsin state court judges
20th-century American judges
20th-century American engineers
20th-century American politicians
20th-century American lawyers
Republican Party members of the Wisconsin State Assembly